Duet is an album by Muhal Richard Abrams featuring duet performances with Amina Claudine Myers which was released on the Italian Black Saint label in 1981.

Reception
Critical views of the album have been mixed. The Allmusic review by Ron Wynn states "This was an intense, yet also swinging, enjoyable session, one in which Abrams displayed the mastery of multiple genres that's distinguished his music, and Myers her distinctive mix of secular and spiritual elements". The Penguin Guide to Jazz awarded the album  stars stating "Retrospect hasn't changed our view that the two pianists simply get in each other's way". The Rolling Stone Jazz Record Guide called the album "a surprisingly lyrical and diverse encounter".

Track listing
All compositions by Muhal Richard Abrams except as indicated
 "Transparency of Lobo Lubu" - 9:55  
 "Miss Amina" - 7:42  
 "Swang Rag Swang" - 4:30  
 "Down the Street from the Gene Ammons Public School" - 5:05  
 "Journey Home as Seen Through the Fairness of Life" - 6:49  
 "Dance from the East" (Amina Claudine Myers) - 6:00  
 "One for Peggy" (Abrams, Myers) - 4:09  
Recorded May 11 & 12, 1981 at Barigozzi Studio, Milano

Personnel
Muhal Richard Abrams – piano
Amina Claudine Myers – piano

References

1981 albums
Muhal Richard Abrams albums
Black Saint/Soul Note albums